I'm Sorry, But I Love You is a 2016 South Korean television series starring Kim Min-seo, Park Sun-ho, Lee In, Na Ya and Kim Joo-ri. It airs on SBS on Mondays to Fridays at 8:30 AM KST starting December 19, 2016.

Summary 
A lethal but innocent love story of a man who only pursued success for his family towards a woman who lost everything after finding her husband’s rich parents.

Cast

Main cast 
 Kim Min-seo as Jung Mo-ah / Kang Nam-shil
Do-hoon's ex-wife, grew up in orphanage with him. She has a child Jae-min with Do-hoon. Hated by Myung-suk because of her poor background.

 Park Sun-ho as Kang Nam-goo / Shin Min-joon
He grew up in grassroots. He is a kind, helpful and passionate youngster. Because of his good personalities, the people around him.

 Lee In as Park Do-hoon
He grew up in orphanage with Mo-ah, was a kind-hearted person at first. After he discovered that he is the son of the chairman of TMO Group, it changed his whole life.

 Na Ya as Cha Young-hwa
Daughter of the member of National Assembly. She was rebellious so that she did not accept the arranged marriages offered by her parents in the past. After her parents discovered that she is suffering from Infertility, she was forced to become Do-hoon's new wife.

 Kim Joo-ri as Shin Hee-joo
A kind-hearted person with charming and beautiful appearances, daughter of Shin Tae-hak, chairman of TMO Group. She loves to help improving the living quality of the poor children in Africa.

People around Mo-ah 
 Lee Eung-kyung as Jung Sook-ja
Mo-ah's aunt.

 Lee Seung-hyung as Gong Man-soo
Mo-ah's uncle.

 Ham Hyung-ki as Jung Mo-hyuk
Mo-ah's younger brother.

 Lee Joo-sil as Lee Kkot-nim
Sook-ja's mother-in-law.

 Cho Yeon-woo as Gong Chun-soo
Man-soo's younger brother.

 Son Hwa-ryung as Gong Shin-ae
Sook-ja and Man-soo's daughter.

 Choi Jung-hoo as Park Jae-min
Mo-ah and Do-hoon's son.

People around Nam-goo 
 Hwang Mi-seon as Kim Soo-book
Nam-goo's mother.

 Heo Young-ran as Kang Nam-hee
Nam-goo's elder sister, suffering from a slight intellectual disability.

People around Do-hoon 
 Hyun Suk as Shin Tae-hak
Do-hoon's father, TMO Group's chairman.

 Cha Hwa-yeon as Hong Myung-sook
Do-hoon's mother.

 Lee Chang-hoon as Shin Tae-jin
Tae-hak's younger brother.

 Jung Jae-eun as Mrs.Min

Others 
 Cha Yeob as Kim Joong-dae
Nam-goo's best friend.

 Lee Eun-chae as Lee Joo-hee
 Oh Na-mi as Yoon Joo
 Kim Dong-gyun as Ma Dong-gyun
 Goo Hye-ryung as Housekeeper
 Kim Kwang-in as Jo Sang-hyun
 Kim Shin as Secretary Choi

Cameos 
 Lee Han-wi as Park Dong-jin
 Bang Eun-hee as Home shopping model
 Lee Yeon-kyung as Show host
 Park Jung-woo as Lawyer Park

Awards and nominations

References

External links
 I'm Sorry, But I Love You official SBS website 
 I'm Sorry, But I Love You official SBS International website 

Seoul Broadcasting System television dramas
2016 South Korean television series debuts
2017 South Korean television series endings
Television series by Celltrion Entertainment